Sandra Keith (born December 11, 1980) is an Olympic Games biathlete for Team Canada. She was part of Canada's team in the 2006 Winter Olympics in Turin.

Keith retired after the 2009–10 season.

Personal life
Sandra Keith was one of about 20 alumni of the National Sport School (located in Calgary ) to compete in the 2006 games. She is a student at Athabasca University, working on her Bachelor of Commerce degree. She was married to Norwegian biathlon star Halvard Hanevold from 2011 until his death in 2019. She was part of a group of five athletes who posed for the Bold Beautiful Biathlon calendar.

References

External links
AU student competes at the Olympics
CBC Bio
Sandra Keith on Real Champions
Nude calendar fund raiser for the 2010 games

Living people
Canadian female biathletes
Olympic biathletes of Canada
Skiers from Ottawa
1980 births
Athabasca University alumni
Biathletes at the 2006 Winter Olympics